
Gmina Czarnia is a rural gmina (administrative district) in Ostrołęka County, Masovian Voivodeship, in east-central Poland.

Villages
Gmina Czarnia contains the villages and settlements of Bandysie, Brzozowy Kąt, Cupel, Cyk, Czarnia, Długie, Michałowo, Rutkowo and Surowe.

Neighbouring gminas
Gmina Czarnia is bordered by the gminas of Baranowo, Chorzele, Myszyniec, Rozogi and Wielbark.

References

External links
Polish official population figures 2006

Czarnia
Ostrołęka County